Anandaram Dhekial Phukan (1829–1859) was one of the pioneers of Assamese literature in the Orunodoi era who joined in the literary revolution initiated by missionaries. He was remembered for his efforts in promoting the Assamese language. He played a major role in reinstating the Assamese language as the official language of Assam.

Early life and education
Phukan was born in 1829 at Guwahati in the Dhekial Phukan family. His father Haliram Dhekial Phukan wrote and published Asom Buronji and Kamakhya Yatrapaddhati in Bengali and distributed them freely. He also contributed to the Bengali magazine Samachar Chandrika.

Anandaram started his school life in Guwahati. In 1841, the then commissioner Jenkins sponsored him to go to Calcutta and study in Hindu College. After studying for three years there, he came back to Guwahati and took further lessons in English from Mr. Blend. He also took up some lessons in Sanskrit and Urdu.

He got married in 1846 and took a government job the following year. He served as Dewan of the king of Bijani, Munsif, and Junior Assistance Commissioner, among other positions.

Literary life
Anandaram Dhekial Phukan started his literary life at the age of 17. From then until his death his sole aim was the development of his land and its people, to the detriment of his own health, which led Col. Hopkins to compare him to the  Raja Rammohan Roy of West Bengal.

In 1847, Anandaram published Englandor Biwaran (Description of England) in Orunodoi. In 1849, he published Asomiya Lorar Mitra (Assamese Children's Friend) in two volumes containing almost 400 pages, which is considered a milestone in the history of Assamese literature. In 1853, when Moffat Mills came to Assam to review the economic condition, Anandaram Dhekial Phukan presented him with a report written in lucid English describing the political and administrative situation of Assam, in-depth analysis of problems faced by the Assamese language and education system, and reasons and solutions to the poor economic condition of the Assamese people. He published another book, A few remarks on Assamese language, in English in 1855, in which he discussed the independent criteria of the language and the grievous outcome of imposing Bengali as the official language in Assam. This book mentions about 62 religious books and 40 plays. In addition, he started working on two dictionaries (Assamese to English, English to Assamese) and sent some parts of these to Orunodoi but their fate remains unknown.

His love for his motherland can be gathered from the following passage taken from his essay Englandor Biworon (Account of England): "O Almighty Lord; enlighten them, so that they can learn their misery and wretchedness; with your magical powers, civilize them! Make them capable so that they can recognize your power and come under your sway. O dear lord! hasten and bring in a new era - when jungles of Assam will turn into flower gardens, when river boats will give way to steam ships, when mud houses will turn into concrete homes, when thousands of schools be established in villages, when gjan sabhas and hospitals will aid the poor, when violence will wither away and people will live in peace, love and harmony forever. |"

Death
Anandaram Dhekial Phukan died at the age of 29 on 16 June 1859.

See also
 Assamese literature
 List of people from Assam
 List of Assamese-language poets
 List of Assamese writers with their pen names

References

External links
 Anandaram Dhekial Phukan at WorldCat.
 Anandaram Dhekial Phukan from Library of Congress Name Authority File.
 

Writers from Guwahati
People from Kamrup Metropolitan district
Writers from Northeast India
1829 births
1859 deaths
19th-century Indian poets
Bengali-language writers
Indian male writers
19th-century Indian male writers
Poets from Assam
Assamese-language writers